Massimo Lotti (born 7 March 1969) is an Italian footballer who played as a goalkeeper. He spent half of his career at Lega Pro (ex-Serie C).

Career
Born in Formia, Lazio, halfway between Rome, Lazio and Naples, Campania, Lotti started his senior career at Serie D side Arzanese, which located at Arzano, the Province of Naples. He then left for another Serie D side Albanova which located at Casal di Principe, Campania. He won promotion in 1994 and played 2 seasons at Serie C2. In summer 1996, he joined Serie B side Castel di Sangro.

In summer 1998, he was signed by Serie B side Lecce and played as Fabrizio Lorieri's backup along with Vincenzo Marruocco. Lecce won promotion in June 1999 and the club signed Antonio Chimenti as first choice and Lotti worked as backup along with Ivan Aiardi. He played his only match at Serie A on 24 October 1999, a 2-4 loss to Lazio. In summer 2001, he left for Serie C1 side Arezzo, which he shared the starting role with Marco Giannitti and Alessio Sarti. In summer 2002, he joined Serie C1 side Benevento where he was the first choice. In summer 2005, he was signed by newly formed Serie C2 S.S.C. Venezia, which replaced the bankrupted A.C. Venezia. He was the first choice at the first season, played 23 league matches. At the end of season, he was offered a new 2-year contract. In the next season, Venezia signed Giuseppe Aprea and played as first choice. In 2007-08 season, he shared the first choice role with  Aprea and mid-season signing Enrico Alfonso also played 7 times. But in 2008-09 season, Aprea resume as starting keeper. After the bankrupt of SSC Venezia, he remained at Venice for newly formed Serie D side Unione Venezia. He retired as a player in 2011, and became goalkeeper coach for Venezia in 2014.

Honours
Venezia
Serie C2: 2006

References

External links
 

Italian footballers
Serie A players
Serie B players
U.S. Lecce players
S.S. Arezzo players
Benevento Calcio players
Venezia F.C. players
Association football goalkeepers
Sportspeople from the Province of Latina
1969 births
Living people
Footballers from Lazio